Horizon Hills is a township situated in Iskandar Puteri, Johor Bahru District, Johor, Malaysia. It is Gamuda Land’s first township out of the Klang Valley. Jointly developed with UEM Land, the township spans over 1,200 acres.

Type of development 
Horizon Hills is a gated and guarded development ranging across 1,200 acres of freehold land. Which was first opened in 2006. The township consists of 13 residential precincts.

Horizon Hills’ homes are built in small clusters to encourage community interaction. Parks, lakes and regional open spaces such as gardens, parks, wetlands and cycling path networks are integrated into the development.

Transportation
Horizon Hills is accessible via the North-South Expressway, Skudai Expressway and Perling Expressway.

It has four entrances (two of which will only be open in future), and the first two entrances can be accessed directly from a highway, making it fast, easy and convenient.

References

Iskandar Puteri
Townships in Johor
Towns and suburbs in Johor Bahru District